Phi Kappa Tau, commonly known as Phi Tau, is a collegiate fraternity located in the United States. The fraternity was founded in 1906. As of March 2023, the fraternity has 161 chartered chapters, 82 active chapters, 5 Associate chapters and about 3,500 collegiate members. SeriousFun Children's Network, founded by Beta chapter alumnus Paul Newman, is Phi Kappa Tau's National Philanthropy. According to its Constitution, Phi Kappa Tau is one of the few social fraternities that can accept graduate students as well as undergraduates.

Phi Kappa Tau's mission statement is "To champion a lifelong commitment to brotherhood, learning, ethical leadership, and exemplary character." The fraternity's vision is "To be recognized as a leadership organization that binds men together and challenges them to improve their campuses and the world."

History
Phi Kappa Tau Fraternity (commonly called Phi Tau) was founded in the Union Literary Society Hall of Miami University's Old Main Building in Oxford, Ohio, on March 17, 1906. The four founders were Taylor A. Borradaile, Clinton D. Boyd, Dwight I. Douglass, and William H. Shideler.

The fraternity was founded as the non-Fraternity Association to give Miami's non-fraternity men a voice in campus political affairs. The name was changed to Phrenocon on March 6, 1909. The two proposed names were the "Miami Friends" and the "Miami Comrades", which were combined to form "Frenocom". "Phrenocon" was actually an alternate spelling of "Frenocom", the idea being to make the name sound more Greek.

Phrenocon became "national" in 1911 when an organization of independent men known as the Ohio University Union chose to become the Ohio University chapter of Phrenocon. Additional Phrenocon chapters were established at Ohio State University, Centre College, Mount Union College, and the University of Illinois. At Miami, Phrenocon began to have difficulty retaining members by the early 1910s. Often, men would join Phrenocon, then later withdraw their membership and join Greek-letter fraternities. In fact, the Miami chapters of Delta Tau Delta and Sigma Alpha Epsilon were founded by Phrenocon members. For that reason, the Miami chapter of Phrenocon withdrew from the National Phrenocon and adopted the name Phi Kappa Tau on March 9, 1916. Since 1919, Phi Kappa Tau has published a magazine, The Laurel. Previously, the magazine was known as Sidelights. The rest of the chapters agreed to the name change on December 21 of that year and invited Miami to return to the national organization as the Alpha chapter of Phi Kappa Tau. Eta chapter at Muhlenberg College was the first chapter to charter after the change to Phi Kappa Tau. As part of their risk management policy, Phi Kappa Tau prohibits chapters from engaging in hazing and underage drinking. The fraternity recognizes a National Hazing Prevention Week in late September.

Phi Kappa Tau has been a member since 1916 of the North American Interfraternity Conference (NIC), a consortium of national men's social fraternities.

Phi Kappa Tau Foundation
The Phi Kappa Tau Foundation was created in 1945 as a separate charitable organization.  The Foundation's significant expansion began in 1983 with the announcement of a challenge gift of over $1 million from Ewing T. Boles, a member of fraternity's Delta chapter at Centre College. The Boles gift was the largest gift to a fraternity or sorority foundation up until that time and became the lead gift in a $3.2-million capital campaign. That same year Boles was named an Honorary Founder by Phi Kappa Tau. Boles left an additional bequest of over $3 million to the Foundation upon his death. Its current assets exceed $15 million.

Organization and leadership
Phi Kappa Tau chapters are organized into Resident Councils which include the current collegiate members of a chapter and Graduate Councils made up of all members who have graduated or left school. Each council of a chapter is entitled to a vote at the National Convention, which typically meets every two years and is the highest level of authority in the organization. The convention elects a National Council which serves as a board of directors for the fraternity and governs between conventions.

Executive offices of the Phi Kappa Tau Fraternity and Foundation are in Oxford, Ohio. Dale Holland (Kent State) is national president and Jeffrey Hilperts (Spring Hill) is chair of the Phi Kappa Tau Foundation.

Men of Character Programs

The Phi Kappa Tau Men of Character Programs' mission is to build a greater and deeper understanding of the values of Phi Kappa Tau. This is intended to help the organization to build and sustain outstanding chapters and to help members grow as leaders.

The Presidents Academy trains new chapter presidents in the responsibilities of a president. Participants are taught how to lead effective meetings, create constructive relationships, and manage crises. Participants also network with other chapter and national Fraternity leaders.

Regional Conferences are one-day conferences designed to prepare incoming officers for their positions, while providing additional members training to be more effective chapter leaders. The conferences educate participants on leadership skill building, an overview of Fraternity operations and the day-to-day tasks of the particular offices.

The Leadership Academy is the Fraternity' individualized leadership-development event. The four-day program is offered in two to three sessions of 40-60 students at summer camps across the country.

A Building Men of Character (BMC) Retreat is a two-day chapter-focused program intended to help chapters develop a vision and plan of action.

Good to Great Retreats are modeled after ideas presented in James C. Collins' book Good to Great. They are four-hour programs designed to assist chapters with specific issues or needs. The programs focus on such topics as recruiting men of character, Ritual, Executive Council transitions, and risk management through a program called "ResponseAbility".

The Volunteer Development Institute is a three-day program designed for volunteers who work directly with chapters. The program is focused on working with college students and providing volunteers with an understanding of the national organization.

Controversies
In 2003, Bradley University student Robert Schmalz, age 22, died from alcohol poisoning during a rush week event. The event happened shortly before the university received a national award for its efforts to reduce alcohol abuse.

In November 2006, the Phi Kappa Tau Upsilon chapter at Nebraska Wesleyan University experienced the death of Ryan Stewart, age 19, and the critical injury of three other students in an early morning house fire. The fraternity's national officers imposed a four year suspension on the chapter after the citation of three chapter members for hazing unrelated to the house fire and the arrest of the chapter's rush president for an incident of attempted first-degree arson occurring the same night as the house fire, but, according to the Lincoln Police Department, unrelated to the house fire itself. Eyewitnesses reported fireworks being lit off earlier that morning, with investigators later finding several fireworks prohibited by University code and of a type illegal in the state of Nebraska in and around the house. Investigators also found marijuana, glass pipes, and items covered in blood in the house. The student-body president of the university, a chapter member, repudiated the disciplinary action undertaken by the University and the fraternity's National Convention by noting how the chapter, "[felt] betrayed by our university and by our national council." He added that charges filed by Lincoln Police Department against three of the chapter's members were “completely bogus." The house was renovated and members moved back in the house after a six year gap in a charter from the National Convention and a lack of University recognition. This incident caused sprinklers to be installed in every building affiliated with the University and alcohol to be prohibited from university-recognized Greek housing.

In 2007, Gary DeVercelly Jr., age 18, died from alcohol poisoning while pledging the fraternity at Rider University. The chapter was dissolved, and three students were indicted in the death with one receiving three years probation. Atypically, two university officials were also indicted, although charges against the officials were later dropped.

In 2012, the College of William & Mary suspended Phi Kappa Tau for three years due to a repeated history of hazing, culminating in an incident when something was stolen from Colonial Williamsburg during a scavenger hunt held for new recruits.

In October 2013, the Phi Kappa Tau chapter at the Georgia Institute of Technology was suspended after an email from one member to other members titled "Luring your rapebait." While the email's author subsequently released an apology, the chapter was suspended by the school's Office of Student Integrity until 2017 after a university investigation concluded that the chapter engaged in a "pattern of sexual violence that suggests a deep-rooted culture within the fraternity that is obscene, indecent and endangers women." A lawsuit was filed in 2014 against the national and local chapter by two plaintiffs who claim they were raped by a fraternity member. The suit states that the alleged rapist has been expelled from Georgia Tech.

In 2016, the Miami University suspended the fraternity for at least four years for forcing pledges to participate in abusive workouts, be held overnight against their will, and act as servants by cleaning members' rooms and writing their papers for them. Phi Kappa Tau's Miami chapter had been previously suspended for a fireworks battle with neighboring Sigma Alpha Epsilon in 2012 which led to police discovering drugs and drug paraphernalia in the groups' houses.

Notable members

Chapters

As of Mrch 2023, Phi Kappa Tau reports chartering 161 chapters since its founding, with 82 active chapters and 5 Associate chapters.

References

External links

Further information

 Anson, Jack L., The Golden Jubilee History of Phi Kappa Tau, Lawhead Press, Athens Ohio: 1957
 Ball, Charles T., From Old Main to a New Century: A History of Phi Kappa Tau, Heritage Publishers, Phoenix: 1996    

 
Student organizations established in 1906
Student societies in the United States
North American Interfraternity Conference
Miami University
1906 establishments in Ohio